Shavetail was an experimental American rocket developed during the 1950s. Used to evaluate the rapidly developing technology of rocketry, eleven Shavetail rockets were fired during 1959.

Design and development
Intended to assist in the development of rocket and missile technologies, Shavetail was a small, inexpensive, unguided solid-fueled rocket that was capable of being modified to be tested in various configurations. Among the systems tested was one to ensure precise payload separation at motor burnout.

Operational history
A series of eleven launches of the Shavetail rocket were conducted in late 1959, starting in August and ending in October.

References

Notes

Bibliography

Experimental rockets of the United States
Cold War rockets of the United States